Williston Mill Historic District is a national historic district in Denton, Caroline County, Maryland. It consists of two historic structures—a grist mill and a miller's house—which share the acreage with the mill stream and race that empties into Mill Creek, a tributary of the Choptank River. The Williston miller's house is a two-story, four-bay single-pile frame dwelling, built originally between 1840 and 1850 with later 19th century expansions.  The mill building dates from around 1830–1840, with the two-story section built around 1895.  It is one of two grist mills that remain standing in Caroline County.

It was added to the National Register of Historic Places in 2002.

An early morning fire on June 26, 2014, destroyed most of the grist mill. In 2015 it was decided that the grist mill would not be rebuilt.

References

External links
, including photo dated 2001, at Maryland Historical Trust
Boundary Map of the Williston Mill Historic District, Caroline County, at Maryland Historical Trust

Denton, Maryland
Historic districts in Caroline County, Maryland
Historic districts on the National Register of Historic Places in Maryland
Houses on the National Register of Historic Places in Maryland
Greek Revival architecture in Maryland
Italianate architecture in Maryland
Grinding mills in Maryland
National Register of Historic Places in Caroline County, Maryland
Grinding mills on the National Register of Historic Places in Maryland